Allegheny station is a SEPTA Regional Rail station located along the Manayunk/Norristown Line located at 22nd Street and Allegheny Avenue in the Swampoodle neighborhood of North Philadelphia. It has also been known in Reading and early SEPTA timetables as 22nd Street or Twenty-Second Street, a name also shared by a former Pennsylvania Railroad station on the Trenton and Chestnut Hill lines. Allegheny station is the first station along SEPTA's Manayunk/Norristown Line not to be shared with any other line.  In FY 2013, Allegheny station had a weekday average of 76 boardings and 102 alightings.

Station layout

References

External links
 

SEPTA Regional Rail stations
Former Reading Company stations
Railway stations in the United States opened in 1938